The 1992 Torneo Godó was the 40th edition of the Torneo Godó annual men's tennis tournament played on clay courts in Barcelona, Catalonia, Spain and part of the Championship Series of the 1992 ATP Tour. The tournament took place from 6 April through 12 April 1992, and Carlos Costa won the singles title.

Finals

Singles

 Carlos Costa defeated  Magnus Gustafsson 6–4, 7–6, 6–4

Doubles

 Andrés Gómez /  Javier Sánchez defeated  Ivan Lendl /  Karel Nováček 6–4, 6–4

References

External links
 Official tournament website
 ATP tournament profile

Torneo Godo
Barcelona Open (tennis)
Godo
Torneo Godó